Neutral is an unincorporated community in Cherokee County, Kansas, United States.  It is located approximately five miles northwest of Baxter Springs along the St. Louis and San Francisco Railway. Brush Creek flows past the northeast side of the community and flows into the Spring River near Riverton five miles to the east.

History
Neutral once had a post office; it was discontinued in 1907.

References

Further reading

External links
 Cherokee County maps: Current, Historic, KDOT

Unincorporated communities in Cherokee County, Kansas
Unincorporated communities in Kansas